Spermatogenesis associated 13 is a protein that in humans is encoded by the SPATA13 gene.

References

Further reading